Il Mattino di Padova is an Italian newspaper published in Padua, Italy.

The newspaper, which was first published in 1978, is part of GEDI Gruppo Editoriale and specifically GEDI News Network, controlling La Repubblica, La Stampa, Il Secolo XIX and several local newspapers. In Veneto, other than Il Mattino di Padova, GEDI publishes La Nuova Venezia, La Tribuna di Treviso and Corriere delle Alpi.

As of 2020, the newspaper is edited by Paolo Possamai.

External links
 

1978 establishments in Italy
Italian-language newspapers
Newspapers established in 1978
Daily newspapers published in Italy